José Ignacio Berruet Michelena (born 23 April 1973) is a Spanish retired footballer who played as a centre back.

Club career

Berruet was born in Irun, in the Bidasoaldea region of the province of Gipuzkoa in the Basque autonomous community, and began his career in the youth teams of Irun-based Real Unión. After spells with Behovia and Real Unión's B team, he joined the Unión first team in 1990. They won back-to-back Tercera División group titles in 1991–92 and 1992–93, and on the second occasion also won promotion to Segunda División B. Berruet continued to play for the club in the third tier until the 1995–96 campaign, before joining Segunda División side Deportivo Alavés in January of that season.

Berruet played a key role as Alavés won the Segunda División title in 1997–98, earning promotion to La Liga in the process. He made his top flight debut on 20th September, as Alavés secured a 1–0 home win over Real Zaragoza at Mendizorrotza. He made 36 appearances over the following season and a half, before joining second tier Villarreal in January 2000. He won top flight promotion again at the end of that season, and made a further 45 La Liga appearances for Villarreal over two and a half seasons. He joined Córdoba in the Segunda División in February 2003.

With Córdoba sufferring relegation at the end of the 2004–05 campaign, Berruet left to join Lorca Deportiva, who were moving in the opposite direction. He spent one season with Lorca before dropping a division himself, returning to his roots by rejoining Real Unión. He played for the club for the next three years, helping them win their Segunda División B group and earn promotion in his final season. He retired in 2009 at the age of 36.

International career

Berruet received one cap for the Basque Country representative side, which came in a 5–1 win over Uruguay in 1998. He was never a call-up in the Spain national team.

Honours
Real Unión
Tercera División: 1991–92, 1992–93
Segunda División B: 2008–09

Deportivo Alavés
Segunda División: 1997–98

Career statistics

1. Appearances in the 2002 UEFA Intertoto Cup
2. Appearances in the 2007 Segunda División B play-offs
3. Appearances in the 2009 Segunda División B play-offs

References

External links

1973 births
Living people
Sportspeople from Irun
Footballers from the Basque Country (autonomous community)
Spanish footballers
Association football defenders
La Liga players
Segunda División players
Segunda División B players
Tercera División players
Divisiones Regionales de Fútbol players
Real Unión footballers
Deportivo Alavés players
Villarreal CF players
Córdoba CF players
Lorca Deportiva CF footballers
Basque Country international footballers